Eskilstrup is a town some  north of Nykøbing Falster on the Danish island of Falster. As of 2022, it had a population of 1,066.

History

Eskilstrup Church built in the Romanesque style dates from the 12th century. In accordance with a local tradition, it is painted red. It is best known for its frescos, said to be Denmark's oldest. 

The town has grown up around Eskilstrup Station which opened together with the Falster Railway in 1872. The earliest buildings included the businesses and hotel close to the station on the main street.

The town today
Eskilstrup is conveniently located close to the E47 motorway from Copenhagen to Rødby Havn. Facilities include a school, sportshall, day nursery, food store and a hotel. There are beech woods in the surrounding countryside and it is not far to the coast. Some 300 children attend the local school. Local landmarks include the water tower, windmill and sportshall. Nearby Ønslev benefits from the town's activities and services.

Attractions

Eskilstrup is home to Danmarks Traktormuseum (Denmark's Tractor Museum) with some 200 tractors from the beginnings up to 1970. Also in the neighbourhood is the Krokodille Zoo with Europe's largest collection of living crocodiles.

Notable people 
 Jens Clausen (1891 in Eskilstrup – 1969) a Danish-American botanist, geneticist and ecologist
 Jørgen Hare (1923 in Eskilstrup – 2007) a Danish sports shooter, competed at the 1952 Summer Olympics
 Hjalmar Petersen (1890 in Eskilstrup - 1968 in Columbus, Ohio) a Danish-American politician who was the 23rd Governor of Minnesota

References

External links
Eskilstrup from Guldborgsund Municipality 
  

Falster
Cities and towns in Region Zealand
Guldborgsund Municipality